Dang Qiu (born 29 October 1996) is a German professional table tennis player.

Career
In June 2022, Qiu defeated Dimitrij Ovtcharov in seven games at the WTT Contender in Lima. The victory helped him reach world No. 10 in the ITTF world ranking.

In August 2022, Qiu defeated Darko Jorgic 4–1 in the European Table Tennis Championships Finals.

Personal life
Qiu was born in Nürtingen, Germany in a family of Chinese descent. He comes from a family of table tennis enthusiasts. His parents were table tennis players trained in Jiangsu, China and moved to Germany in the 1990s. Dang's father, named Jianxin Qiu started to coach in Japan in 1997. Dang's older brother, named Liang Qiu is also a table tennis player in Germany.

Singles titles

References

Living people
1996 births
German male table tennis players
German people of Chinese descent
People from Nürtingen
Sportspeople from Stuttgart (region)
World Table Tennis Championships medalists